Chamuaktong Fightermuaythai (born November 10, 1988), also known as Chamuaktong Sor Yupinda, is a retired Muay Thai fighter.

Titles and accomplishments
 2020 Siam Omnoi Stadium 147lbs Champion
 2017 Rajadamnern Stadium 140lbs Champion
 2016 Toyota Marathon Tournament Champion
 2016 World Muay Thai Council 140lbs Champion
 2013 Lumpinee Stadium 140 lbs Champion

Fight record

|-  style="background:#cfc;"
| 2022-08-05 || Win||align=left| Teeradet Chor.Hapayak|| Petchyindee Muaymanwansuk, Rangsit Stadium || Rangsit, Thailand || Decision || 5 || 3:00
|-  style="background:#fbb;"
| 2022-03-03 || Loss ||align=left| Nuenglanlek Jitmuangnon|| Petchyindee, Rajadamnern Stadium || Bangkok, Thailand || Decision || 5 || 3:00

|- style="background:#fbb;"
| 2021-12-02 || Loss||align=left| Chujaroen Dabransarakarm || Petchyindee, Rangsit Stadium || Bangkok, Thailand || Decision || 5 || 3:00
|-  style="background:#fbb;"
| 2021-10-21|| Loss||align=left| Ratchasing RongrienKelaKorat || Petchyindee + Muay Thai Moradok Kon Thai || Buriram province, Thailand || Decision || 5||3:00
|-  style="background:#fbb;"
| 2021-04-08|| Loss ||align=left| Panpayak Jitmuangnon || SuekMahakamMuayRuamPonKon Chana + Petchyindee|| Songkhla Province, Thailand || Decision || 5 || 3:00
|-  style="background:#cfc;"
| 2020-12-11|| Win ||align=left| Kaewkangwan Priwayo || True4U Muaymanwansuk, Rangsit Stadium ||Rangsit, Thailand || Decision || 5 || 3:00
|-  style="background:#FFBBBB;"
| 2020-10-02 || Loss ||align=left| Capitan Petchyindee Academy || Rangsit Stadium || Rangsit, Thailand || Decision  || 5 || 3:00
|-  style="background:#cfc;"
| 2020-08-08 || Win ||align=left| Phonek Or.Kwanmuang || Siam Omnoi Stadium || Samut Sakhon Province, Thailand || Decision  || 5 || 3:00
|-
! style=background:white colspan=9 |
|-  style="background:#CCFFCC;"
| 2019-12-19 || Win ||align=left| Yodpanomrung Jitmuangnon || Rajadamnern Stadium || Bangkok, Thailand || Decision  || 5 || 3:00
|-  style="background:#CCFFCC;"
| 2019-10-06 ||Win  ||align=left| Yuki Masui || Suk Wanchai MuayThai Super Fight vol.6 || Nagoya, Japan ||Decision || 5 || 3:00
|-  style="background:#FFBBBB;"
| 2019-08-22 || Loss ||align=left| Panpayak Sitchefboontham || Rajadamnern Stadium || Bangkok, Thailand || Decision  || 5 || 3:00
|-
! style=background:white colspan=9 |
|-  style="background:#CCFFCC;"
| 2019-06-27 || Win ||align=left| Panpayak Sitchefboontham || Rajadamnern Stadium || Bangkok, Thailand || Decision  || 5 || 3:00
|-  style="background:#FFBBBB;"
| 2019-05-28 || Loss ||align=left| Rafi Bohic || Lumpinee Stadium || Bangkok, Thailand || TKO || 5 ||
|-  style="background:#CCFFCC;"
| 2019-02-16 || Win ||align=left| Charlie Peters || ONE Championship: Clash of Legends || Bangkok, Thailand || Decision (Majority)  || 3 || 3:00
|-  style="background:#CCFFCC;"
| 2018-10-10 || Win ||align=left| Yodpanomrung Jitmuangnon || Rajadamnern Stadium || Bangkok, Thailand || Decision  || 5 || 3:00
|-
! style=background:white colspan=9 |
|-  bgcolor="#CCFFCC"
| 2018-09-15 || Win || align=left| Kaito ||SHOOT BOXING2018 act.4 || Tokyo, Japan || Ext.R Decision (Majority) || 6 || 3:00
|-  bgcolor="#CCFFCC"
| 2018-08-29 || Win || align=left| Yukimitsu Takahashi || SUK WAN KINGTHONG Go to Raja || Tokyo, Japan || Decision (Unanimous) || 5 || 3:00
|-  style="background:#CCFFCC;"
| 2018-07-27 || Win ||align=left| Brown Pinas || ONE Championship: Heroes of Honor || Manila, Philippines || Decision  || 3 || 3:00
|-  style="background:#CCFFCC;"
| 2018-06-22 || Win ||align=left| Jay Tonkin || Toyota Revo Championship || Thailand || TKO || 4 || 
|-
! style=background:white colspan=9 |
|-  style="background:#CCFFCC;"
| 2018-05-26 || Win ||align=left| Cedric Do || Topking World Series || Bangkok, Thailand || Decision  || 3 || 3:00
|-  style="background:#CCFFCC;"
| 2017-12-29 || Win ||align=left| Yodpanomrung Jitmuangnon || Lumpinee Stadium || Bangkok, Thailand || Decision  || 5 || 3:00
|-  style="background:#CCFFCC;"
| 2017-11-06 || Win ||align=left| Yodpanomrung Jitmuangnon || Rajadamnern Stadium || Bangkok, Thailand || Decision  || 5 || 3:00
|-
! style=background:white colspan=9 |
|-  style="background:#CCFFCC;"
| 2017-08-06 || Win ||align=left| Tatsuya Ishii || Battle of Muay Thai 15 || Tokyo, Japan || KO (Left knee) || 1 || 1:07
|-
! style=background:white colspan=9 |
|-  style="background:#FFBBBB;"
| 2017-06-05 || Loss ||align=left| Yodpanomrung Jitmuangnon || Rajadamnern Stadium || Bangkok, Thailand || Decision  || 5 || 3:00
|-  style="background:#FFBBBB;"
| 2017-03-21 || Loss ||align=left| Chujaroen Dabransarakarm || Lumpinee Stadium || Bangkok, Thailand || Decision || 5 || 3:00
|-  style="background:#CCFFCC;"
| 2016-12-09 || Win ||align=left| Chujaroen Dabransarakarm || Lumpinee Stadium || Bangkok, Thailand || Decision || 5 || 3:00
|-
! style=background:white colspan=9 |
|-  style="background:#CCFFCC;"
| 2016-10-06 || Win ||align=left| Yodpanomrung Jitmuangnon || Rajadamnern Stadium || Bangkok, Thailand || Decision || 5 || 3:00
|-  style="background:#CCFFCC;"
| 2016-09-02 || Win ||align=left| Chujaroen Dabransarakarm || Lumpinee Stadium || Bangkok, Thailand || Decision || 5 || 3:00
|-  style="background:#FFBBBB;"
| 2016-07-29 || Loss ||align=left| Phetmorakot Petchyindee Academy || Toyota Hilux Revo Superchamp Tournament, Semi Finals || Tokyo, Japan || Decision || 3 || 3:00
|-  style="background:#CCFFCC;"
| 2016-07-29 || Win ||align=left| Shoto Sato || Toyota Hilux Revo Superchamp Tournament, Quarter Finals || Tokyo, Japan || Decision || 3 || 3:00
|-  style="background:#CCFFCC;"
| 2016-06-24 || Win ||align=left| Dejrit Poptheeratham || Toyota Marathon, final  || Bangkok, Thailand || Decision || 3 || 3:00 
|-
! style=background:white colspan=9 |
|-  style="background:#CCFFCC;"
| 2016-06-24 || Win ||align=left| Numa Decagny || Toyota Marathon, Semi final  || Bangkok, Thailand || TKO (knees to the body) || 2 ||
|-  style="background:#CCFFCC;"
| 2016-06-24 || Win ||align=left| Naimjon Tutaboev  || Toyota Marathon, Quarter finals || Bangkok, Thailand || Decision  || 3 || 3:00
|-  style="background:#CCFFCC;"
| 2016-06-10 || Win ||align=left| Petpanomrung Kiatmuu9 ||  Wanweraphon Fight, Lumpinee Stadium || Bangkok, Thailand || Decision || 5 || 3:00
|-
! style=background:white colspan=9 |
|-  style="background:#FFBBBB;"
| 2016-04-07 || Loss ||align=left|  Petpanomrung Kiatmuu9 || Petwiset Fights, Rajadamnern Stadium || Bangkok, Thailand || Decision || 5 || 3:00
|-  style="background:#CCFFCC;"
| 2015-12-08 || Win ||align=left| Singdam Kiatmuu9 || Lumpinee Stadium || Bangkok, Thailand || Decision || 5 || 3:00
|-
! style=background:white colspan=9 |
|-  style="background:#FFBBBB;"
| 2015-11-09 || Loss ||align=left| Yodpanomrung Jitmuangnon || Rajadamnern Stadium || Bangkok, Thailand || Decision || 5 || 3:00
|-  style="background:#CCFFCC;"
| 2015-10-13 || Win ||align=left| Satanfah Rachanon || Lumpinee Stadium || Bangkok, Thailand || Decision || 5 || 3:00
|-  style="background:#c5d2ea;"
| 2015-08-06 || Draw ||align=left| Yodpanomrung Jitmuangnon || Rajadamnern Stadium || Bangkok, Thailand || Decision  || 5 || 3:00
|-  style="background:#FFBBBB;"
| 2015-06-11 || Loss ||align=left| Petchboonchu FA Group || Rajadamnern Stadium || Bangkok, Thailand || Decision || 5 || 3:00
|-  style="background:#CCFFCC;"
| 2015-04-02 || Win ||align=left| Nong-O Kaiyanghadaogym || Rajadamnern Stadium || Bangkok, Thailand ||Decision || 5  || 3:00
|-  style="background:#FFBBBB;"
| 2014-09-10 || Loss ||align=left| Nong-O Kaiyanghadaogym || Rajadamnern Stadium || Bangkok, Thailand || Decision || 5 || 3:00
|-  style="background:#FFBBBB;"
| 2014-07-25 || Loss ||align=left| Petchboonchu FA Group || Toyota Marathon, final  || Bangkok, Thailand || Decision || 3 || 3:00
|-  style="background:#CCFFCC;"
| 2014-07-25 || Win ||align=left| Craig Dickson || Toyota Marathon, Semi final  || Bangkok, Thailand || TKO (knees to the body) || 2 ||
|-  style="background:#CCFFCC;"
| 2014-07-25 || Win ||align=left| Emmanuele Corti  || Toyota Marathon, Quarter final  || Bangkok, Thailand || KO (Elbows) || 1 ||
|-  style="background:#FFBBBB;"
| 2014-06- || Loss||align=left| Saensatharn P.K. Saenchai Muaythaigym || Lumpinee Stadium || Bangkok, Thailand || Decision || 5 || 3:00
|-
! style=background:white colspan=9 |
|-  style="background:#FFBBBB;"
| 2014-03-30 || Loss ||align=left| Singdam Kiatmuu9 || Charity Event for School || Songkhla, Southern Thailand || Decision || 5 || 3:00
|-  style="background:#FFBBBB;"
| 2014-01-07 || Loss ||align=left| Yodwicha Por Boonsit || Lumpinee Stadium || Bangkok, Thailand || Decision || 5 || 3:00
|-
! style=background:white colspan=9 | 
|-  style="background:#CCFFCC;"
| 2013-12-03 || Win ||align=left| Nong-O Kaiyanghadaogym || Lumpinee Stadium || Bangkok, Thailand || Decision || 5 || 3:00
|-
! style=background:white colspan=9 | 
|-  style="background:#CCFFCC;"
| 2013-11-04 || Win ||align=left| Yodkhunpon Sitmonchai || Rajadamnern Stadium || Bangkok, Thailand || Decision || 5 || 3:00
|-  style="background:#CCFFCC;"
| 2013-10-11 || Win ||align=left| Nong-O Kaiyanghadaogym || Lumpinee Stadium || Bangkok, Thailand || Decision || 5 || 3:00
|-  style="background:#FFBBBB;"
| 2013-09-04 || Loss ||align=left| Singdam Kiatmuu9 || Rajadamnern Stadium || Bangkok, Thailand || Decision || 5 || 3:00
|-  style="background:#CCFFCC;"
| 2013-08-03 || Win ||align=left| Petchboonchu FA Group || Rajadamnern Stadium || Bangkok, Thailand || Decision || 5 || 3:00
|-  style="background:#CCFFCC;"
| 2013-06-25 || Win ||align=left| Aranchai || Rajadamnern Stadium || Bangkok, Thailand || Decision || 5 || 3:00
|-  style="background:#FFBBBB;"
| 2010-02-07 || Loss ||align=left| Sittisak Petpayathai || Channel 7 Boxing Stadium || Bangkok, Thailand || Decision || 5 || 3:00
|-
! style=background:white colspan=9 | 
|-
| colspan=9 | Legend:

References

1993 births
Chamuaktong Fightermuaythai
Living people
ONE Championship kickboxers
Chamuaktong Fightermuaythai